Approach angle is the maximum angle of a ramp onto which a vehicle can climb from a horizontal plane without interference.  It is defined as the angle between the ground and the line drawn between the front tire and the lowest-hanging part of the vehicle at the front overhang. Departure angle is its counterpart at the rear of the vehicle – the maximum ramp angle from which the car can descend without damage. Approach and departure angles are also referred to as ramp angles.

Approach and departure angles are indicators of off-road ability of the vehicle: they indicate how steep obstacles, such as rocks or logs, the vehicle can negotiate according to its body shape alone.

See also
 Breakover angle
 Overhang (automotive)
 Ride height

References

External links
 Approach and Departure Angles at Why High End?

Automotive engineering